Scott King (born 1969) is a graphic designer and visual artist. Past experiences include Art Director of i-D and Creative Director of Sleazenation magazines, for which he was awarded 'Best Cover' and 'Best Designed Feature of the Year' prizes. King occasionally produces work under the banner 'CRASH!' with writer and historian Matt Worley.

King’s work has been exhibited widely in European and American galleries, including the Institute of Contemporary Arts in London, Kunst-Werke in Berlin, Portikus in Frankfurt, White Columns in New York, Kunstverein Munich and the Museum of Modern Art in New York.

References 

1969 births
Living people
English graphic designers
English contemporary artists